Joel Stave (born May 16, 1992) is a former American football quarterback. He played college football at Wisconsin.

High school career
Joel Stave attended Whitnall High School in Greenfield, Wisconsin, where he was a three-year letter winner in football and track and field and two in basketball. As a junior, Stave passed for 4,459 yards and 39 touchdowns and ran for an additional five touchdowns. He was honorable mention all-state by the WFCA, first-team all-region, all-suburban, all-conference, and second-team all-area as a junior. As a senior, Stave threw for 3,635 yards and 47 touchdowns and ran for an additional 2,346 yards and seven touchdowns. He earned first-team all-state honors by the WFCA, honorable mention A.P. all-state honors, unanimous conference player of the year, first-team all-conference and second-team all-region as a senior. In his career with Whitnall, Stave threw for 5,094 yards and 41 touchdowns and added 12 rushing touchdowns.

Following his high school career, Stave was rated a two-star recruit by both Scout.com and Rivals.com. He was also rated the number 17th rated or top 10th player from the state of Wisconsin and the 110th ranked quarterback in the country.

College career
Stave left Wisconsin as the school's all-time winningest quarterback with a 31–10 record as a starter. His .756 win percentage ranks No. 3 among Wisconsin quarterbacks. In his career with the Badgers, he started 41 games (third-most by a quarterback in school history) and went 22–6 (.786) as a starter against Big Ten opponents, setting school records for wins and winning percentage in conference games. He threw for 7,635 yards and 48 touchdowns, ranking second in school history in both categories. He also finished his career ranked No. 2 in passing attempts (1,031) and completions (613) and No. 4 in completion percentage (59.5%). He threw for over 200 yards in a game 18 times, the most in school history and became the first quarterback in school history to post a 4–0 record against an opponent, doing so against Purdue, Illinois and Minnesota. Stave finished his career with a 23-21 win in the Holiday Bowl vs USC and was named offensive MVP of the Holiday Bowl.

Redshirt season (2011)

Stave enrolled in spring semester and took part in spring practice.

Freshman season (2012)

On September 15, Stave made his Badgers debut against Utah State. Stave made his first career start on September 22 against UTEP and became the first Wisconsin freshman quarterback to start since Jim Sorgi on October 21, 2012. He recorded a career-high 254 passing yards on October 6 against Illinois. Stave was injured on October 27 against Michigan State missing the rest of the regular season and the 2012 Big Ten Football Championship Game. He returned in the 2013 Rose Bowl and attempted one pass in the game.

Sophomore season (2013)

Stave recorded his first career rushing touchdown on August 31 against UMass. Established new career highs in completions (24), attempts (29) and touchdown passes (3) against Tennessee Tech on September 7.

Junior season (2014)

Stave passed for 1,350 yards, nine touchdowns, and 10 interceptions in the 2014 season.

Senior season (2015)

As a senior, Stave passed for 2,687 yards and 11 touchdowns. In winning his final game of his collegiate career Joel Stave was named Holiday Bowl Offensive MVP and captured the title of winningest quarterback in Badgers history with 31 career wins, surpassing Brooks Bollinger's record set in 2002.

Stave finished his career at Wisconsin as program's all-time leader in wins as a starting quarterback, with 31. Stave, a civil engineering major, also finished All-Academic Big Ten four times, breaking a record previously held by Drew Brees. He was also given the Big Ten Medal of Honor in 2016.

Statistics

Source:

Professional career

Minnesota Vikings
Stave signed as an undrafted free agent with the Minnesota Vikings in 2016. On September 3, 2016, he was released by the Vikings as part of final roster cuts.  The next day, he was signed to the Vikings' practice squad. He was released by the Vikings on October 25, 2016.

Seattle Seahawks
On October 26, 2016, the Seattle Seahawks signed Stave to their practice squad. He was released by the Seahawks on November 1, 2016.

Kansas City Chiefs
On November 8, 2016 Stave was signed to the Kansas City Chiefs' practice squad. He signed a reserve/future contract with the Chiefs on January 19, 2017. He was waived on September 2, 2017.

Washington Redskins
On October 3, 2017, Stave was signed to the Washington Redskins' practice squad. He was released on October 17, 2017.

New York Jets
On December 12, 2017, Stave was signed to the New York Jets' practice squad. He signed a reserve/future contract with the Jets on January 1, 2018. He was waived on April 14, 2018.

Cleveland Browns
On April 30, 2018, Stave was signed by the Cleveland Browns. He was waived by the Browns on May 7, 2018.

References

External links
 Wisconsin bio 
 Minnesota Vikings bio 

1992 births
Living people
American football quarterbacks
Wisconsin Badgers football players
Minnesota Vikings players
Players of American football from Wisconsin
People from Greenfield, Wisconsin
Kansas City Chiefs players
Washington Redskins players
New York Jets players
Cleveland Browns players
Seattle Seahawks players
Sportspeople from the Milwaukee metropolitan area